"Take Me to the Limit" is a 1997 song by German Eurodance group Mr. President, released as the second single from their third album, Night Club (1997). It was a notable hit in Europe, peaking at number 11 in Germany, number 16 in Austria, number 18 in Finland and number 21 in Switzerland. On the Eurochart Hot 100, it reached number 44 in October 1997. The music video was directed by John Buche, who also directed the videos for "Coco Jamboo", "I Give You My Heart" and "Show Me the Way".

Track listing

Charts

References

 

1997 singles
1997 songs
Mr. President (band) songs
Warner Records singles